The 10th Gaon Chart Music Awards ceremony was held on January 13, 2021, via virtual livestream from studio without any performance and on-site audience due to COVID-19 pandemic in South Korea. BTS was the most awarded act with 6 awards, followed by Blackpink with 4 and IU with 3.

Winners and nominees 
 Winners are listed first, highlighted in boldface, and indicated with a double-dagger.
 Nominees

References 

Gaon
Gaon